New York State Route 215 (NY 215) is a north–south state highway located entirely within Cortland County, New York, in the United States. NY 215 is largely a rural connector highway, except for the final  in the city of Cortland. The entirety of NY 215 was originally part of NY 90. In the early 1980s, NY 90 was truncated north to its junction with U.S. Route 11 (US 11) and NY 41 in the village of Homer. Its former routing south of the city was redesignated as NY 215 and NY 392.

Route description

NY 215 begins at an intersection with NY 392 in the hamlet of Virgil within the town of the same name. NY 392 enters the junction from the south and exits to the east, while NY 215 heads northward, running alongside Virgil Creek as it winds its way through the rural, hilly town. Virgil Creek ends south of the Virgil–Cortlandville town line; however, NY 215 continues on, initially rising in elevation before heading downhill as it crosses into Cortlandville. It continues downhill toward Cortland, providing views of the city and the surrounding Tioughnioga River valley, which holds Cortland and the nearby village of Homer.

It finally levels off upon reaching the base of the valley, where the road passes through a stretch of significant development just outside the Cortland city limits, its first in the town heading northbound. The amount of development increases substantially over the next several blocks in the city, where it becomes Owego Street. NY 215 continues north to Tompkins Street, where the street and route both end at NY 13. NY 215 is maintained by the New York State Department of Transportation (NYSDOT) from NY 392 to the Cortland city line, where it becomes city-maintained for the remainder of its routing.

History
The north–south highway linking Virgil to Cortland was originally designated as part of NY 90, a new highway extending from Messengerville in the south to Montezuma in the north via Virgil and Cortland, in the 1930 renumbering of state highways in New York. On April 1, 1981, ownership and maintenance of a highway linking NY 90 in Virgil to the Tompkins–Cortland county line was transferred from Cortland County to the state of New York. Following the transfer, NY 90 was truncated on its southern end to its junction with US 11 in the village of Homer north of Cortland. The former routing of NY 90 from Virgil to Cortland was redesignated as NY 215 while the Virgil–Messengerville section became part of NY 392, which also extended westward into Tompkins County over the new state-maintained highway.

Major intersections

See also

References

External links

215
Transportation in Cortland County, New York